Kevin Kim defeated Somdev Devvarman 6–4, 6–7(8–10), 6–4 in the final.

Seeds

Draw

Finals

Top half

Bottom half

References
 Main Draw
 Qualifying Draw

Virginia National Bank Men's Pro Championship - Singles
2009 Singles